Slope Point is the southernmost point of the South Island of New Zealand.

A nearby locality—Haldane—was named after the original European settlers, the Haldane family.

The land around Slope Point is used for sheep farming with no houses anywhere nearby. Eroded cliffs drop down to the sea below. An AA signpost there shows the distance to the Equator and the South Pole, and a small solar-powered lighthouse stands on farmland.

There is no road to Slope Point; it can be reached by a 20-minute walk following dilapidated yellow markers. Its latitude, longitude is approximately 46.67 S, 169.00 E. There is no public access during the lambing season (September – November).

See also 
Jacquemart Island

References

Headlands of Southland, New Zealand
The Catlins
Foveaux Strait
Southland District